Ospina is a town and municipality in the Nariño Department, Colombia.

See also
Germán Ospina

Municipalities of Nariño Department